Lakeside Garden may refer to:

In Hong Kong
Lakeside Garden, a public housing estate

In Singapore
 Lakeside Garden, part of Jurong Lake Gardens at Jurong East, Singapore